Dyspessa wiltshirei is a species of moth of the family Cossidae. It is found in Iraq and Lebanon.

References

Moths described in 1938
Dyspessa
Moths of Asia